KCDD (103.7 FM, "Power 103") is a radio station that serves the Abilene, Texas, area with a top 40 (CHR) music format. The station is under ownership of Cumulus Media.

History

Ray F. Silva won the construction permit for a new radio station at 103.7 in Hamlin in 1984. After Silva sold the permit to B&D Communications, the station came to air in 1987 as KWZD "Wizard 103", with a country music format. MHHF Media acquired KWZD in 1987, shortly after signing on.
When MHHF went into receivership in 1991, B&D Communications bought back the station for $265,000 and sold it to Taylor County Broadcasting for $320,000; the new owners relaunched it as KCDD "CD103", which was originally a soft rock station but flipped to CHR in late 1992. Big Country Broadcasting acquired KCDD in 1995; Cumulus bought the station in 1998.

References

External links
KCDD official website

CDD
Contemporary hit radio stations in the United States
Radio stations established in 1987
Cumulus Media radio stations